People involved with the French Resistance include:

A 

José Aboulker (1920–2009)
Berty Albrecht (1893–1943)
Dimitri Amilakhvari (1906–1942), French-Georgian Prince
Louis Aragon (1897–1982), poet, novelist and editor, husband of Elsa Triolet
Raymond Aron (1905–1983)
 (1921–1944)
Emmanuel d'Astier de la Vigerie (1900–1969)
Henri d'Astier de la Vigerie, Roman Catholic conservative politician
Lucie Aubrac (1912–2007)
Marie-Thérèse Auffray (1912–1990), artist
Jacqueline Auriol (1917–2000)
Vera Atkins, 1907-2000, OSS

B 

Josephine Baker (1906–1975), African American singer, dancer,
Louis Bancel (1926–1978), sculptor
 Raoul Batany (1926–1944), assassin of 
Samuel Beckett (1906–1989), Irish writer, winner of the 1969 Nobel Prize in Literature
Georges Bégué (1911–1993), SOE
Robert Benoist (1895–1944)
Charles Berty (1911–1944), French professional cyclist 
Georges Bidault (1899–1983)
Monique de Bissy (1923–2009)
 (1904–1944)
 (1914–1942)
Denise Bloch (1916–1945)
Marc Bloch (1886–1944), historian, founded the Annales School of historiography
France Bloch-Sérazin (1913–1943), chemist, bomb-maker for the Resistance
Tony Bloncourt (1921–1942)
Marc Boegner (1881–1970) 
Cristina Luca Boico (1916–2002)
Fernand Bonnier de La Chapelle (1922–1942), assassinated admiral François Darlan
Claude Bourdet (1909–1996), co-founder of Combat
Éliane Brault (1898–1982)
Gilberte Brossolette (1905–2004), French journalist and politician
Pierre Brossolette (1903–1944)

C 

Claude Cahun (1894–1954), French photographer, sculptor and writer
Albert Camus (1913–1960), French novelist, winner of the 1957 Nobel Prize in Literature
Marcel Carné (1906–1996), French film director
Henri Cartier-Bresson (1908–2004), French photographer
Rouben Melik (1921–2007), French-Armenian poet
Shapour Bakhtiar (1914–1991), later to become Prime minister of Iran during last days of Iranian Revolution
Roger Carcassonne (1911–1991)
Donald Caskie (1902–1983)
Neus Català (1915–2019), Spanish Holocaust survivor and Republican militan
Jean Cavaillès (1903–1944)
Jacques Chaban-Delmas (1915–2000)
René Char (1907–1988)
Marie-Louise Charpentier 1905–1998
Peter Churchill (1909–1972), SOE
Eugène Claudius-Petit (1907–1989)
Marianne Cohn (1922–1944)
 (1897–1943)
Daniel Cordier (1920–2020), secretary of Jean Moulin and later historian
René-Yves Creston (1898–1964), Breton artist and ethnographer
Nancy Cunard (1896–1965), poet, writer and anarchist who worked in London as a translator

D 

Apolônio de Carvalho (1912–2005), Brazilian revolutionary
Jacques Decour (1910–1942), French writer
Charlotte Delbo (1913–1985)
 Catherine Dior (1917-2008) sister of French Couturier, Christian Dior
Jacques Desoubrie (1922–1949)
Martha Desrumeaux (1897–1982)
François Ducaud-Bourget (1897–1984), Roman Catholic priest
Jacques Duclos (1896–1975)
Marguerite Duras (1914–1996), French writer

E 

Jacques Ellul (1912–1994)
Paul Éluard (1895–1952), French poet
Henri Honoré d'Estienne d'Orves (1901–1941), French right wing naval officer
Joseph Epstein (1911–1944)

F 

Valentin Feldman (1909–1942), French philosopher
Henri Fertet (1926–1943), schoolboy and Resistance fighter
Antoinette Feuerwerker (1912–2003), wife of David Feuerwerker, member of Combat
David Feuerwerker, (1912–1980), rabbi of Brive-la-Gaillarde, member of Combat
Marie-Madeleine Fourcade (1909–1989)
Henri Frager (1897–1944)
Henri Frenay (1905–1988), founder of Combat, minister in the first post-liberation government
Varian Fry (1907–1967), American journalist

G 

Cristino García (1914–1946)
Geneviève de Gaulle-Anthonioz (1920–2002), niece of General de Gaulle
Salomon Gluck (1914–1944), physician
Gheorghe Gaston Grossmann (1918–2010) (changed his name from Grossman to Marin after he returned to Romania after World War II)
Henri Marie Joseph Grouès (1912–2007), better known as Abbé Pierre, Catholic priest and Maquis
William Grover-Williams (1903–1945), Anglo-French racing driver
Albert Guérisse (1911–1989)
Georges Guingouin (1913–2005), communist resistance

H 
Virginia Hall (1906–1982), American spy, SOE
Ernest Hemingway (1899–1961), American writer and journalist
Boris Holban (1908-2004), leader of the FTP-MOI
Michel Hollard (1898–1993)
Wilhelm Holst (1895–1949) SOE
Arthur Honegger (1892–1955)
André Hue (1923-2005), SOE
Max Hymans (1900–1961)

I 

René Iché (1897–1954), artist, sculptor

J 

Vladimir Jankélévitch (1903–1985)
Éliane Jeannin-Garreau (1911–1999)
Louis Jourdan (1921–2015), French actor
Germain Jousse (1895–1988)

K 

Bernard Karsenty (1920–2007)
Marcelle Kellermann
Chana Kowalska (1899–1942), Polish Jewish painter and journalist
Maurice Kriegel-Valrimont (1914–2006)

L 

 (1903–1943)
Joseph Laniel (1889–1975)
Madeleine Lavigne (1912–1945), Isabelle, agent of the Special Operations Executive
 (1905–1974)
Édouard Le Jeune (1921–2017), former Senator
André Leroi-Gourhan (1911–1986)
André Le Troquer (1884–1963)
Jacques Lusseyran (1924–1971)

M 

André Malraux (1901–1976) ("Colonel Berger"), French writer and government minister
Missak Manouchian (1906–1944), poet, leader of the eponymous network as part of FTP-MOI
Robert Marjolin (1911–1986)
Suzanne Masson (1901–1943)
Marie Médard (1921–2013)
Lucien Julien Meline (1901–1943)
Jean-Pierre Melville (1917–1973), French film director
Pierre Mendès-France (1907–1982), French politician
Edmond Michelet (1899–1970), last to leave Dachau while aiding the sick, twice government minister after the war
Jacques Monod (1910–1976), Nobel Prize in Physiology or Medicine (1965)
Marcel Moore (1892–1972), French illustrator, designer, and photographer
Jean Moulin (1899–1943), head of the CNR

N 

Prince Louis Napoléon (1914–1997), pretender to the French Imperial throne
Eileen Nearne (1921–2010), SOE, Agent Rose
 (1895–1967), French Resistance Leader
Suzanne Noël (1878–1954), French plastic surgeon

P 

Andrée Peel (1905–2010), Agent Rose
Édith Piaf (1915–1963), French singer
Pablo Picasso (1881–1973, Spanish artist)
Thérèse Pierre (1908–1943)
Jean Pierre-Bloch (1905–1999)
Christian Pineau (1904–1995)
Eliane Plewman (1917–1944), SOE
Georges Politzer (1903–1942)
Francis Ponge (1899–1988)
Jean Prévost (1901–1944), writer, conceived and organized the Maquis du Vercors

R 
Adrienne Ranc-Sakakini (1916–2014), member of F2 network in Marseille
Paul Rassinier (1906–1967), member of Libération-Nord
Adam Rayski, FTP-MOI leader.
Serge Ravanel (1920–2009)
Gilbert Renault (1904–1984)
Jean-François Revel (1924–2006), French writer and philosopher
Marc Riboud (1923–2016), photographer, participated in the Maquis du Vercors
Madeleine Riffaud (born 1924), French poet and war correspondent
André Rogerie (1921–2014), French writer and Holocaust survivor

S 

Alexander Sachal (1924-2020), Russian artist
Armand Salacrou (1899–1989)
Raymond Samuel (1914–2012), alias Raymond Aubrac
Solange Sanfourche (1922–2013), alias Marie-Claude
Odette Sansom (1912–1995), SOE
Jorge Semprún (1923–2011), Spanish writer, member of FTP and then FTP-MOI, later Culture Minister of Spain
Ariadna Scriabina (1905–1944), daughter of composer Alexander Scriabin, co-founder of the Armée Juive
Marcelle Semmer (1895 – c. 1944), recipient of the Croix de Guerre (1915)
Claude Simon (1913–2005)
Susana Soca (1906–1959), Uruguayan poet and socialité
Raymond Sommer (1906–1950, French racing driver
Suzanne Spaak (1905–1944), sister-in-law of Paul-Henri Spaak
Roger Stéphane (1919–1994), French journalist
Evelyne Sullerot (1924–2017), historian and sociologist
Violette Szabo (1921–1945), SOE

T 

François Tanguy-Prigent (1909–1970)
Paul Tarascon (1882–1977), World War I flying ace
Drue Leyton (1903–1997), also known as Dorothy Tartière
Édith Thomas (1909–1979), French historian and journalist
Germaine Tillion (1907–2008), French anthropologist
Charles Tillon (1897–1993), member of FTP
Elsa Triolet (1896–1970), writer, wife of Louis Aragon
Michael Trotobas, 1914–1943), "Capitaine Michel," agent, Special Operations Executive
Madeleine Truel (1904–1945)
Tristan Tzara (1896–1963), French-Romanian poet

V 

Marie-Claude Vaillant-Couturier (1912–1996)
Rose Valland (1898–1980), French art historian and museum curator of Galerie nationale du Jeu de Paume
Jean-Pierre Vernant (1914–2007), French philologist and anthropologist
Berthe Vicogne-Fraser (1894–1956)
Pierre Villon (1901–1980), member of FTP, one of the three leaders of the Committee of Military action created by the Conseil National de la Résistance
 (1899–1945)
Philippe de Vomécourt (1902–1964)
Pierre de Vomécourt (1906–1986)
Traian Vuia (1872–1950), Romanian inventor

W 

Nancy Wake (1912–2011), SOE
Gabrielle Weidner (1914–1945)
Johan Hendrik Weidner (1912–1994)
Simone Weil (1909–1943)
Jean-Pierre Wimille (1908–1949), French racing driver

Y 
Chuck Yeager (1923–2020), American test pilot, one of the Allied pilots shot down over France who made it back to England with the help of the Resistance

Resistance members
French Resistance
Resistance members